Aviacsa has served the following destinations:

Mexico
Destinations served at closure:
Chiapas
Tapachula – Tapachula International Airport
Tuxtla Gutiérrez – Angel Albino Corzo International Airport
Federal District
Mexico City – Mexico City International Airport Hub
Nuevo León
Monterrey – General Mariano Escobedo International Airport
Oaxaca
Oaxaca – Xoxocotlán International Airport
Quintana Roo
Cancún – Cancún International Airport
Tabasco
Villahermosa – Carlos Rovirosa Pérez International Airport
Yucatan
Mérida – Manuel Crescencio Rejon International Airport

Terminated destinations
Destinations terminated before closure:
Mexico – Acapulco, Chetumal, Ciudad Juárez, Culiacán, Guadalajara, Hermosillo, Leon, Mexicali, Morelia, Puerto Vallarta, Tampico, Tepic, Tijuana, Veracruz, Zacatecas
United States – Chicago-O'Hare, Dallas/Fort Worth, Houston-Intercontinental, Las Vegas, Los Angeles, Miami, St. Louis
Guatemala – Guatemala City

References

Aviacsa